Lowdham railway station is a Grade II listed railway station which serves the village of Lowdham in Nottinghamshire, England.

History
It is on the Nottingham to Lincoln Line, which was engineered by George Stephenson and opened by the Midland Railway on 3 August 1846. The contractors for the line were Craven and Son of Newark and Nottingham; the buildings were probably designed by Thomas Chambers Hine.

The buildings originally comprised a combined station building and station master's house, a weighbridge hut at the entrance to the goods yard, a goods shed, and stables for the horses that drew the drays to deliver goods. A waiting room, a porter's room and a lamp hut were on the opposite platform from the station building, and a signal box across the road on that side, next to the level crossing. The signal box was opened on 14 June 1896. This Midland Railway Type 2b box was the oldest on the line when abolished in 2016.

In 1953 the station made national headlines when a train stopped blocking the level crossing for 45 minutes as the engine driver, Fred Jones and his fireman David Mews had "a few words". The driver stopped because he thought there was not enough water in his boiler and he blew the fire out. The fireman thought there was enough pressure in the boiler for them to continue. The driver requested water for the engine and a relief fireman. Many of the passengers alighted from the train and shouted angrily whilst the driver and fireman held a discussion. British Rail supplied a relief fireman and a relief driver to resolve the situation.

The station was Grade II listed on 13 May 1986.

The main station building is now in private ownership; it has been renovated and used to exhibit items on the history of the Midland Railway. In 2016, the line was re-signalled by Network Rail, making the signal boxes at Lowdham redundant. The signal box closed on 1 October 2016 when control transferred to the East Midlands Integrated Electronic Control Centre at Derby

In 2017, the Nottingham-bound platform was extended to compensate for the reduction in usable platform caused by the positioning of one of the new signals.

In October 2020, the 1896 signal box at the level crossing was removed overnight to be restored by charity Lowdham Railway Heritage as a museum.

Stationmasters
The station suffered difficulties with its early station masters. The Stamford Mercury of 10 May 1861 records that Leonard Moore committed suicide by hanging on 8 May 1861, and reported that he was the fifth station master at Lowdham who has either committed suicide or suffered imprisonment for embezzling the money of the Midland Railway Company.

Evelyn Walters 1846-1850 (charged with embezzling money)
George Reeves ca.1851–1857 (sentenced to six months’ hard labour for embezzling money)
Leonard Moore ca. 1859–1861 (committed suicide)
J. Ashton ca. 1861
G. Hodgkinson ca. 1862
R. Peddle until 1863 (afterwards station mastter at Kibworth)
Caleb Porter from 1863 (formerly station master at Kibworth)
Henry Hall. ca. 1868–1871
Thomas Wormall until 1873 
W.G. Watkins 1874-1879
Samuel Savage 1879-1885 (formerly station master at Castle Donington)
G. Croft 1885-1888
George Butler 1888-1907 (afterwards station master at Blesby)
George Ernest Aiers 1907–1911 (formerly station master at Bleasby)
S. Eaton from 1911 (formerly station master at Radford)
J. Fawkes ca. 1914
F. Hickman until 1937 (formerly station master at Rotten Park Road, Tile Hill)
J.F. Georgeson from 1937 (formerly station master at Goostrey, also station master at Thurgarton)
H. Simpson ca. 1946 ca. 1950
George Tubbs ca. 1953

Services
All services at Lowdham are operated by East Midlands Railway.

The typical off-peak service in trains per hour is:
 1 tph to  via 
 1 tph to 

There is also a daily return service between Lincoln and London St Pancras International which is operated by a Class 222 Meridian. This service does not run on Sundays.

On Sundays, there is a roughly hourly service between Nottingham and Lincoln from mid-morning onwards.

References

Gallery

External links

Lowdham Railway Heritage

Railway stations in Nottinghamshire
DfT Category F2 stations
Former Midland Railway stations
Railway stations in Great Britain opened in 1846
Railway stations served by East Midlands Railway
Grade II listed buildings in Nottinghamshire
Grade II listed railway stations
1846 establishments in England
Thomas Chambers Hine railway stations
Lowdham